"Get It On" is the first single by hard rock/glam metal band Kingdom Come from their self-titled debut album. It reached number four on the Billboard Album Rock Tracks chart and number 69 on the Billboard Hot 100 singles chart.

Track listing
"Get It On" (Music - L. Wolf / Words - M. Wolff, L. Wolf) 4:23
"17" (Music - L. Wolf / Words - M. Wolff, L. Wolf) 5:28
"Loving You" (Music - L. Wolf, D. Stag / Words - M. Wolff, L. Wolf) 4:46

Personnel
Lenny Wolf – lead vocals
Danny Stag – lead guitar
Rick Steier – rhythm guitar, keyboards
Johnny B. Frank – bass
James Kottak – drums

Charts

References

External links
Music Video

1988 songs
1988 debut singles
Kingdom Come (band) songs
Music videos directed by Kevin Kerslake
Polydor Records singles
Song recordings produced by Bob Rock